Apgujeong-dong is a ward of Gangnam-gu in Seoul, South Korea. It is considered one of the wealthiest neighborhoods in South Korea. It was reported that housing price of Apgujeong-dong is approximately US$28,300 per one square meter by Korea Ministry of Land, Infrastructure and Transport in 2019. The dong originates from a pavilion with the same name founded by Han Myung-hoi, a high-ranking government official during the Joseon dynasty. It is an upmarket residential, fashion, shopping, and educational area. The Hanja name translates into "Seagull Pavilion," a reference to his nickname, which itself was a reference and a mark of peace when viewing a group of seagulls flying.

One of the main shopping area is Apgujeong Rodeo Street, along with Cheongdam-dong Fashion Street in Cheongdam-dong and Garosu-gil in Sinsa-dong, which are connected by the main avenue Apgujeong-ro. It is seen as a fashionable and trendsetting destination.

Characteristics

The area is filled with upscale department stores, shops, boutiques, hagwons, cafes and restaurants. Two main department stores, Hyundai Department Store and Galleria Department Store, are located in this area with both being Flagship Stores.

Apgujeong Rodeo Street is located opposite the Galleria Department Store, with shops of local and international designers as well as Nori Market, The Vanessa Bruno outlet, Mui Mui Cafe, and On Friday Restaurant.

The registered official headquarters of K-pop entertainment agency S.M. Entertainment is located in the eastern side, although company moved their offices to Cheongdam-dong in 2012. The building was renovated and became Global Artist Training Center for SM Entertainment trainees in 2013, until it was renamed as SM Entertainment Celebrity Center in 2017. The Caffè Pascucci coffee chain in Apgujeong was used as one of the main filming locations for Seoul Broadcasting System's 2001 drama Beautiful Days, starring Lee Byung-hun, Choi Ji-woo, Ryu Si-won, Shin Min-a, Lee Jung-hyun and Lee Yoo-jin.

This area is also known for its many plastic surgery clinics.

Education
Schools located in Apgujeong-dong:
 Apgujeong Elementary School
 Apgujeong Middle School
 Sinsa Middle School
 Shingu Middle School
 Apgujeong High School
 Chungdam High School
 Hyundai Senior High School

Transport
It is served by Apgujeong station and Sinsa station on the Seoul Subway Line 3.
There is Bundang Line Apgujeongrodeo station at east, boundary of Cheongdam-dong.
5 Bus lines pass Apgujeong-dong, 143, 145, 147, 148 and 240 and single pass can be used to transfer between bus and subway.

See also
 List of shopping streets and districts by city
 Dong of Gangnam-gu
 Cine de Chef

References

External links
Apgujeong : Official Seoul City Tourism

Shopping districts and streets in South Korea
Neighbourhoods in Gangnam District
Tourist attractions in Seoul